In enzymology, a kynurenine-glyoxylate transaminase is an enzyme that catalyzes the chemical reaction:

L-kynurenine + glyoxylate  4-(2-aminophenyl)-2,4-dioxobutanoate + glycine

Thus, the two substrates of this enzyme are L-kynurenine and glyoxylate, whereas its two products are 4-(2-aminophenyl)-2,4-dioxobutanoate and glycine.

This enzyme belongs to the family of transferases, specifically the transaminases, which transfer nitrogenous groups.  The systematic name of this enzyme class is L-kynurenine:glyoxylate aminotransferase (cyclizing). This enzyme is also called kynurenine-glyoxylate aminotransferase.

References

 

EC 2.6.1
Enzymes of unknown structure